Asturian (formerly also known as  ) is a West Iberian Romance language spoken in the Principality of Asturias, Spain. Asturian is part of a wider linguistic group, the Asturleonese languages. The number of speakers is estimated at 100,000 (native) and 450,000 (second language). The dialects of the Astur-Leonese language family are traditionally classified in three groups: Western, Central, and Eastern. For historical and demographic reasons, the standard is based on Central Asturian. Asturian has a distinct grammar, dictionary, and orthography. It is regulated by the Academy of the Asturian Language. Although it is not an official language of Spain it is protected under the Statute of Autonomy of Asturias and is an elective language in schools. For much of its history, the language has been ignored or "subjected to repeated challenges to its status as a language variety" due to its lack of official status.

History

Asturian is the historical language of Asturias, portions of the Spanish provinces of León and Zamora and the area surrounding Miranda do Douro in northeastern Portugal. Like the other Romance languages of the Iberian peninsula, it evolved from Vulgar Latin during the early Middle Ages. Asturian was closely linked with the Kingdom of Asturias (718–910) and the ensuing Leonese kingdom. The language had contributions from pre-Roman languages spoken by the Astures, an Iberian Celtic tribe, and the post-Roman Germanic languages of the Visigoths and Suevi.

The transition from Latin to Asturian was slow and gradual; for a long time they co-existed in a diglossic relationship, first in the Kingdom of Asturias and later in that of Asturias and Leon. During the 12th, 13th and part of the 14th centuries Astur-Leonese was used in the kingdom's official documents, with many examples of agreements, donations, wills and commercial contracts from that period onwards.

Castilian Spanish arrived in the area during the 14th century, when the central administration sent emissaries and functionaries to political and ecclesiastical offices. Asturian codification of the Astur-Leonese spoken in the Asturian Autonomous Community became a modern language with the founding of the Academy of the Asturian Language in 1980. The Leonese dialects and Mirandese are linguistically close to Asturian.

Status and legislation
Efforts have been made since the end of the Francoist period in 1975 to protect and promote Asturian. In 1994 there were 100,000 native speakers and 450,000 second-language speakers able to speak (or understand) Asturian. However, the language is endangered: there has been a steep decline in the number of speakers over the last century. Law 1/93 of 23 March 1993 on the Use and Promotion of the Asturian Language addressed the issue, and according to article four of the Asturias Statute of Autonomy: "The Asturian language will enjoy protection. Its use, teaching and diffusion in the media will be furthered, whilst its local dialects and voluntary apprenticeship will always be respected.”

However, Asturian is in a legally hazy position. The Spanish Constitution has not been fully applied regarding the official recognition of languages in the autonomous communities. The ambiguity of the Statute of Autonomy, which recognises the existence of Asturian but does not give it the same status as Spanish, leaves the door open to benign neglect. However, since 1 August 2001 Asturian has been covered under the European Charter for Regional or Minority Languages' "safeguard and promote" clause.

A 1983 survey indicated 100,000 native Asturian speakers (12 percent of the Asturian population) and 250,000 who could speak or understand Asturian as a second language. A similar survey in 1991 found that 44 percent of the population (about 450,000 people) could speak Asturian, with from 60,000 to 80,000 able to read and write it. An additional 24 percent of the Asturian population said that they understood the language, making a total of about 68 percent of the Asturian population.

At the end of the 20th century the Academia de la Llingua Asturiana (Academy of the Asturian Language) attempted to provide the language with tools needed to promote its survival: a grammar, a dictionary and periodicals. In addition a new generation of Asturian writers has championed the language. In 2021 the first complete translation of the Bible into Asturian was published.

Historical, social and cultural aspects

Literary history

Although some 10th-century documents have the linguistic features of Asturian, numerous examples (such as writings by notaries, contracts and wills) begin in the 13th century. Early examples are the 1085 Fuero de Avilés (the oldest parchment preserved in Asturias) and the 13th-century Fuero de Oviedo and the Leonese version of the Fueru Xulgu.

The 13th-century documents were the laws for towns, cities and the general population. By the second half of the 16th century, documents were written in Castilian, backed by the Trastámara dynasty and making the civil and ecclesiastical arms of the principality Castilian. Although the Asturian language disappeared from written texts during the sieglos escuros (dark centuries), it survived orally. The only written mention during this time is from a 1555 work by Hernán Núñez about proverbs and adages: " ... in a large copy of rare languages, as Portuguese, Galician, Asturian, Catalan, Valencian, French, Tuscan ... ".

Modern Asturian literature began in 1605 with the clergyman Antón González Reguera and continued until the 18th century (when it produced, according to Ruiz de la Peña in 1981, a literature comparable to that in Asturias in Castilian). In 1744, Gaspar Melchor de Jovellanos wrote about the historic and cultural value of Asturian, urging the compilation of a dictionary and a grammar and the creation of a language academy. Notable writers included Francisco Bernaldo de Quirós Benavides (1675), Xosefa Xovellanos (1745), Xuan González Villar y Fuertes (1746), Xosé Caveda y Nava (1796), Xuan María Acebal (1815), Teodoro Cuesta (1829), Xosé Benigno García González, Marcos del Torniello (1853), Bernardo Acevedo y Huelves (1849), Pin de Pría (1864), Galo Fernández and Fernán Coronas (1884).

In 1974, a movement for the language's acceptance and use began in Asturias. Based on ideas of the Asturian association Conceyu Bable about Asturian language and culture, a plan was developed for the acceptance and modernization of the language that led to the 1980 creation of the Academy of the Asturian Language with the approval of the Asturias regional council.
El Surdimientu (the Awakening) authors such as Manuel Asur (Cancios y poemes pa un riscar), Xuan Bello (El llibru vieyu), Adolfo Camilo Díaz (Añada pa un güeyu muertu), Pablo Antón Marín Estrada (Les hores), Xandru Fernández (Les ruines), Lourdes Álvarez, Martín López-Vega, Miguel Rojo and Lluis Antón González broke from the Asturian-Leonese tradition of rural themes, moral messages and dialogue-style writing. Currently, the Asturian language has about 150 annual publications. The Bible into the Asturian language was completed in 2021 after over 30 years of translation work, beginning in September 1988.

Use and distribution

Astur-Leonese's geographic area exceeds Asturias, and that the language known as Leonese in the autonomous community of Castile and León is basically the same as the Asturian spoken in Asturias. The Asturian-Leonese linguistic domain covers most of the principality of Asturias, the northern and western province of León, the northeastern province of Zamora (both in Castile and León), western Cantabria and the Miranda do Douro region in the eastern Bragança District of Portugal.

Toponymy

Traditional, popular place names of the principality's towns are supported by the law on usage of Asturian, the principality's 2003–07 plan for establishing the language and the work of the Xunta Asesora de Toponimia, which researches and confirms the Asturian names of requesting villages, towns, conceyos and cities (50 of 78 conceyos as of 2012).

Dialects

Asturian has several dialects. They are regulated by the Academia de la Llingua Asturiana and mainly spoken in Asturias (except in the west, where Galician-Asturian is spoken). The dialect spoken in the adjoining area of Castile and León is known as Leonese. Asturian is traditionally divided into three dialectal areas, sharing traits with the dialect spoken in León: western, central and eastern. The dialects are mutually intelligible. Central Asturian, with the most speakers (more than 80 percent), is the basis for standard Asturian. The first Asturian grammar was published in 1998 and the first dictionary in 2000.

Western Asturian is spoken between the rivers Navia and Nalón, in the west of the province of León (where it is known as Leonese) and in the provinces of Zamora and Salamanca. Feminine plurals end in -as

Central Asturian is spoken between the Sella River and the mouth of the River Nalón in Asturias and north of León.

Eastern Asturian is spoken between the River Sella, Llanes and Cabrales.

Asturian forms a dialect continuum with Cantabrian in the east and Eonavian in the west. While this dialect continuum is for the most part smooth, a number of isoglosses cluster together parallel to the River Purón, linking the dialects of eastern Llanes, Ribadedeva, Peñamellera Alta, and Peñamellera Baja with those of Cantabria and separating them from the rest of Asturias. Cantabrian was listed in the 2009 UNESCO Atlas of the World's Languages in Danger. The inclusion of Eonavian (spoken in western Asturias, bordering Galicia) in the Galician language is controversial, since it has traits in common with western Asturian.

Linguistic description
Asturian is one of the Astur-Leonese languages which form part of the Iberian Romance languages, close to Galician-Portuguese and Castilian and further removed from Navarro-Aragonese. It is an inflecting, fusional, head-initial and dependent-marking language. Its word order is subject–verb–object (in declarative sentences without topicalization).

Phonology

Vowels
Asturian distinguishes five vowel phonemes (these same ones are found in Spanish, Aragonese, Sardinian and Basque), according to three degrees of vowel openness (close, mid and open) and backness (front, central and back). Many Asturian dialects have a system of metaphony.

In the post-nuclear syllable margin, they are traditionally heard and transcribed as non-syllabic vowels .

Consonants

  is pronounced  in coda position.
  can have different pronunciations, as a voiced plosive , affricate , or as a voiced fricative .

Writing
Asturian has always been written in the Latin alphabet. Although the Academia de la Llingua Asturiana published orthographic rules in 1981, different spelling rules are used in Terra de Miranda (Portugal).

Asturian orthography is based on a five-vowel system, with three aperture degrees. It has the following consonants: . The phenomenon of -u metaphony is uncommon, as are decrescent diphthongs (usually in the west). Although they can be written, ḷḷ (che vaqueira, formerly represented as "ts") and the eastern ḥ aspiration (also represented as "h." and corresponding to ll and f) are absent from this model. Asturian has triple gender distinction in the adjective, feminine plurals with -es, verb endings with -es, -en, -íes, íen and lacks compound tenses (or periphrasis constructed with "tener").

Alphabet

(*) also zeda, ceda

Digraphs

Asturian has several digraphs, some of which have their own names.

Dialectal spellings
The letter h and the digraph ll can have their sound changed to represent dialectal pronunciation by under-dotting the letters, resulting in ḥ and digraph ḷḷ

 The "ḥ" is common in eastern Asturian place names and in words beginning with f; workarounds such as h. and l.l were used in the past for printing.
 Besides dialectal words, the "ḥ" is also used in some loanwords: ḥoquei (hockey).

Grammar

Asturian grammar is similar to that of other Romance languages. Nouns have three genders (masculine, feminine and neuter), two numbers (singular and plural) and no cases. Adjectives may have a third, neuter gender, a phenomenon known as matter-neutrality. Verbs agree with their subjects in person (first, second, or third) and number, and are conjugated to indicate mood (indicative, subjunctive, conditional or imperative; some others include "potential" in place of future and conditional), tense (often present or past; different moods allow different tenses), and aspect (perfective or imperfective).

Morphology

Gender
Asturian is the only western Romance language with three genders: masculine, feminine and neuter.
 Masculine nouns usually end in -u, sometimes in -e or a consonant: el tiempu (time, weather), l’home (man), el pantalón (trousers), el xeitu (way, mode).
 Feminine nouns usually end in -a, sometimes -e: la casa (house), la xente (people), la nueche (night).
 Neuter nouns may have any ending. Asturian has three types of neuters:
 Masculine neuters have a masculine form and take a masculine article: el fierro vieyo (old iron).
 Feminine neuters have a feminine form and take a feminine article: la lleche frío (cold milk).
 Pure neuters are nominal groups with an adjective and neuter pronoun: lo guapo d’esti asuntu ye... (the interesting [thing] about this issue is ...).

Adjectives are modified by gender. Most adjectives have three endings: -u (masculine), -a (feminine) and -o (neuter): El vasu ta fríu (the glass is cold), tengo la mano fría (my hand is cold), l’agua ta frío (the water is cold)

Neuter nouns are abstract, collective and uncountable nouns. They have no plural, except when they are used metaphorically or concretised and lose this gender: les agües tán fríes (Waters are cold). Tien el pelo roxo (He has red hair) is neuter, but Tien un pelu roxu (He has a red hair) is masculine; note the noun's change in ending.

Number
Plural formation is complex:
 Masculine nouns ending in -u → -os: texu (yew) → texos.
 Feminine nouns ending in -a → -es: vaca (cow) → vaques.
 Masculine or feminine nouns ending in a consonant take -es: animal (animal) → animales; xabón (soap) → xabones.
 Words ending in -z may take a masculine -os to distinguish them from the feminine plural: rapaz (boy) → rapazos; rapaza (girl) → rapaces.
 Masculine nouns ending in -ín → -inos: camín (way, path) → caminos, re-establishing the etymological vowel.
 Feminine nouns ending in -á, -ada, -ú → -aes or -úes, also re-establishing the etymological vowel: ciudá (city) → ciudaes; cansada (tired [feminine]) → cansaes; virtú (virtue) → virtúes.

Determiners
Their forms are:

*Only before words beginning with a-: l’aigla (the eagle), l’alma (the soul). Compare la entrada (the entry) and la islla (the island).

Resources 
The Academy of the Asturian Language has published a grammar describing the Asturian language. It is a comprehensive manual that can be used in schools to facilitate learning.

Additionally, a translator that can translate English, French, Portuguese and Italian, among a few other languages, into Asturian and vice versa is offered online. This software is funded and maintained by members of the University of Oviedo.

Vocabulary
As with other Romance languages, most Asturian words come from Latin: ablana, agua, falar, güeyu, home, llibru, muyer, pesllar, pexe, prau, suañar. In addition to this Latin basis are words which entered Asturian from languages spoken before the arrival of Latin (its substratum), afterwards (its superstratum) and loanwords from other languages.

Substratum
Although little is known about the language of the ancient Astures, it may have been related to two Indo-European languages: Celtic and Lusitanian. Words from this language and the pre–Indo-European languages spoken in the region are known as the prelatinian substratum; examples include bedul, boroña, brincar, bruxa, cándanu, cantu, carrascu, comba, cuetu, güelga, llamuerga, llastra, llócara, matu, peñera, riega, tapín and zucar. Many Celtic words (such as bragues, camisa, carru, cerveza and sayu) were integrated into Latin and, later, into Asturian.

Superstratum
Asturian's superstratum consists primarily of Germanisms and Arabisms. The Germanic peoples in the Iberian Peninsula, especially the Visigoths and the Suevi, added words such as blancu, esquila, estaca, mofu, serón, espetar, gadañu and tosquilar. Arabisms could reach Asturian directly, through contacts with Arabs or al-Andalus, or through the Castilian language. Examples include acebache, alfaya, altafarra, bañal, ferre, galbana, mandil, safase, xabalín, zuna and zucre.

Loanwords
Asturian has also received much of its lexicon from other languages, such as Spanish, French, Occitan and Galician. In number of loanwords, Spanish leads the list. However, due to the close relationship between Castilian and Asturian, it is often unclear if a word is borrowed from Castilian, common to both languages from Latin, or a loanword from Asturian to Castilian. Some Castilian forms in Asturian are:

{| class="wikitable"
|+ Loans
|-
!Spanish
|echar, antoxu, guerrilla, xamón, siesta, rexa, vainilla, xaréu
|-
!Galician
|cachelos, chombada, quimada
|-
!French
|arranchar, chalana, xofer, espáis, foina, galipote, malvís, pote, sable, somier, tolete, vagamar, xarré
|-
!Occitan
|hostal, parrocha, tolla
|}

Lexical comparison

Lord's Prayer

Education

Primary and secondary
Although Spanish is the official language of all schools in Asturias, in many schools children are allowed to take Asturian-language classes from age 6 to 16. Elective classes are also offered from 16 to 19. Central Asturias (Nalón and Caudal comarcas) has the largest percentage of Asturian-language students, with almost 80 percent of primary-school students and 30 percent of secondary-school students in Asturian classes. Xixón, Uviéu, Eo-Navia and Oriente also have an increased number of students.

University
According to article six of the University of Oviedo charter, "The Asturian language will be the object of study, teaching and research in the corresponding fields. Likewise, its use will have the treatment established by the Statute of Autonomy and complementary legislation, guaranteeing non-discrimination of those who use it."

Asturian can be used at the university in accordance with the Use of Asturian Act. 
University records indicate an increased number of courses and amount of scientific work using Asturian, with courses in the Department of Philology and Educational Sciences. In accordance with the Bologna Process, Asturian philology will be available for study and teachers will be able to specialise in the Asturian language at the University of Oviedo.

Internet
Asturian government websites, council webpages, blogs, and entertainment webpages exist. Free software is offered in Asturian, and Ubuntu offers Asturian as an operating-system language. Free software in the language is available from Debian, Fedora, Firefox, Thunderbird, LibreOffice, VLC, GNOME, Chromium and KDE. Minecraft also has an Asturian translation.

Wikipedia offers an Asturian version of itself, with 100,000+ pages as of December 2018.

See also
 Leonese language
 Mirandese language
 List of Asturian language authors
 Extremaduran language
 Ramón Menéndez Pidal
 Category:Asturian-language software in the Asturian Wikipedia

References

Bibliography

 
 
 
 Wurm, Stephen A. (ed) (2001) Atlas of the World's Languages in Danger of Disappearing. Unesco .
  M.Teresa Turell (2001). Multilingualism in Spain: Sociolinguistic and Psycholinguistic Aspects of Linguistic Minority Groups. 
  Mercator-Education (2002): European Network for Regional or Minority Languages and Education. "The Asturian language in education in Spain" ISSN 1570-1239

External links

 Academia de la Llingua Asturiana – the official Asturian language academy
 Dirección Xeneral de Política Llingüística del Gobiernu del Principáu d'Asturies – Bureau of Asturian Linguistic Policy (Government of the Principality of Asturias)
 Asturian grammar in English 
 Asturian–English dictionary
 Xunta pola Defensa de la Llingua Asturiana
 Real Instituto de Estudios Asturianos – Royal Institute of Asturian Studies (RIDEA or IDEA), founded 1945.
 A short Asturian–English–Japanese phrasebook  incl. sound file
 Aconceyamientu de Xuristes pol Asturianu The Advisory Council of Lawyers for Asturian
 II Estudiu Sociollingüísticu d'Asturies (2002)
 Diccionariu de la Academia de la Llingua Asturiana / Dictionary of the Royal Academy of the Asturian Language
 Diccionario General de la lengua asturiana (Asturian — Spanish)
 Eslema, Asturian online translator
 «Asturiano» en PROEL
 Dirección Xeneral de Política Llingüística del Gobiernu del Principáu d'Asturies.
 Proyecto Eslema, "Eslema" Project for the creation of corpus Asturian language domain
 Conferencia sobre socioligüística asturiana impartida por el profesor de la Universidad de Oviedo Ramón d'Andrés en el Instituto Cervantes (Madrid. 2010)

Dictionaries and translators
 Diccionariu de la Academia de la Llingua Asturiana / Dictionary of the Royal Academy of the Asturian Language
 Diccionario General de la lengua asturiana (Asturian — Spanish)
 Eslema, Asturian online translator